Dayanand Anglo Vaidik Mahavidyalaya (D.A.V. College) is a college in Kanpur, Uttar Pradesh, India, established in 1919 by Lala Diwan Chand, is the second oldest college in the city. The college is situated in Civil Lines, opposite the Green Park Stadium. It is affiliated with Chhatrapati Sahu Ji Maharaj University (formerly Kanpur University), formerly with the University of Agra. The college is accredited by the Indian NAAC.  Manas Pandey is present principal of this college. It is managed by the Dayanand Anglo-Vedic College Trust and Management Society.

History
DAV College has contributed immensely to the Indian independence movement. The college hostel is nerve center of patriotic activities. In 1928, Mahatma Gandhi visited here. Incumbent President of India Ram Nath Kovind and former Prime Minister of India Atal Bihari Vajpayee are notable alumni of the college.

Notable alumni
Some notable alumni of this college are the following:

Atal Bihari Vajpayee, former Prime Minister of India
Ram Nath Kovind, incumbent President of India
Vierendrra Lalit, cinematographer and film director
Mahavir Singh (revolutionary), Indian revolutionary
Vallabhdas Aidan Mohta, former Chief Justice of Orissa High Court
Rakesh Sachan, Cabinet minister of Uttar pradesh
Jaidev Kapoor, Indian revolutionary

See also 
 Arya Samaj

References

External links
 

Universities and colleges in Kanpur
Universities and colleges affiliated with the Arya Samaj
Educational institutions established in 1919
1919 establishments in India